This article is a list of notable people related to Cape Verde.

The words “Cabo Verdean” are not always used to express the same notions. They can be used to express:
 People who were born in Cape Verde and/or were raised in Cape Verde, generally having lived most of their lives in Cape Verde and who ethnically identify themselves as Cape Verdeans.
 People who may or may not have born in Cape Verde, having lived most of their lives outside Cape Verde, having a different nationality than Cape Verdean. Many of these people also have Cape Verdean nationality. Most of these people ethnically identify themselves as Cape Verdeans, having strong ties with Cape Verde and Cape Verdean culture.
 People who were not born in Cape Verde but with one or both parents being of one of the two criteria above. Since the ties between Cape Verdean descendants and Cape Verde are usually long lasting, these people often consider themselves as being "Cape Verdeans".

Cape Verdean people

Music – singers, musicians and composers

Mayra Andrade (1985–), singer, living in France
Bana (1932–2013), singer
Bau (1962–), musician, composer
Teófilo Chantre (1964–), musician, living in France
Bela Duarte, artist 
Cesária Évora (1941–2011), singer and global popularizer of morna and coladeira
Fantcha (1956–), singer
Ana Firmino (1953–), singer, living in Portugal
Jotamont (1912–1988), composer of morna
Ildo Lobo (1953–2004), singer with Os Tubarões
Suzanna Lubrano (1975–), zouk singer, living in Netherlands
Vasco Martins (1956–), musician, composer
Karin Mensah (1965–), jazz singer and music educator living in Italy 
Manuel de Novas (1938–2009), composer
Tito Paris (1963–), musician, composer, singer, living in Portugal
Paul Pena (1950–2005), singer-songwriter, guitarist
Fernando Quejas (1922–2005), singer-songwriter
Gil Semedo (1974–), singer, composer, living in Netherlands
Armando Zeferino Soares (1920–2007), composer of the famous song "Sodade"
Eugénio Tavares (1867–1930), greatest composer of morna
Tcheka (1973–), singer, composer, musician
Antoninho Travadinha, violinist
Dona Tututa (1919–2014), composer and pianist

Comedians

Carlos Andrade

Poets

Aguinaldo Fonseca (1922–2014)
Sergio Frusoni (1901–1975), Cape Verdean poet of Italian descent and promoter of the Cape Verdean Creole language
Gabriel Mariano (1928–2002), poet and an essayist
Ovídio Martins (1928–1999), poet, journalist
Manuel de Novas (1938–2009), poet, composer
Eugénio Tavares (1867–1930)
Arménio Vieira (1941–), journalist

Politicians

Honório Barreto (1813–1859), governor of the Portuguese Guinea
Evandro Carvalho (1981–), Massachusetts State Representative
Silvino Manuel da Luz, former Foreign Minister of Cape Verde
Gualberto do Rosário, former Prime Minister of Cape Verde
Abílio Duarte (1931–1996), former Foreign Minister of Cape Verde
Corsino Fortes (1933–2015), ambassador, writer
António Mascarenhas Monteiro (1944–2016), former President of Cape Verde
José Maria Neves (1960–), former Prime Minister of Cape Verde
Aristides Pereira (1923–2011), former President of Cape Verde
Pedro Pires (1934–), former Prime Minister of Cape Verde; former President of Cape Verde
Carlos Veiga (1949–), former Prime Minister of Cape Verde
Jorge Carlos Fonseca (1950–), former President of Cape Verde

Sports

Athletics

Carlos Almeida (1968–), long distance runner
Isménia do Frederico (1971–), sprinter
Alfayaya Embalo, sprinter
Lidiane Lopes (1994–), sprinter
Sónia Lopes (1975–), middle distance and long-distance runner
Denielsan Martins (1987–), sprinter
Eva Pereira (1989–), middle distance and long-distance runner
Ruben Sança (1986–), long-distance runner
Lenira Santos (1987–), sprinter
Euclides Varela (1982–), long-distance runner
António Zeferino (1966–), long-distance runner

Boxing
Flávio Furtado (1978–)
Demetrius Andrade

Basketball

Walter Tavares (1992–)

Football (soccer)
 Bebé
Bijou Davidson (1986–)
Cristiano Ronaldo
Djaniny (1991–)
 Edimilson Fernandes
Freddy dos Santos
Júlio Tavares

Writers

Germano Almeida (1945–), author, lawyer
Orlanda Amarílis (1924–2014)
Jorge Barbosa (1902–1971), poet, writer
Viriato de Barros
Corsino Fortes (1933–2015), poet
António Aurélio Gonçalves (1901–1984), short story writer
Manuel Lopes (1907–2005), novelist, poet, essayist
Baltasar Lopes da Silva (1907–1989), writer, poet, linguist
João Cleófas Martins (1901–1970), photographer, author
Yolanda Morazzo (1928–2009)
Ivone Ramos (1926–2018), poet
Henrique Teixeira de Sousa (1919–2006), writer, doctor, author

Cape Verdean diaspora

Music – singers, musicians and composers

Maria de Barros, Senegalese-born, Mauritanian-grown singer, now living in United States
Lura (1975–), Portuguese-born singer
Boy Gé Mendes (1952–), Senegalese musician, singer and composer, founder of Paris-based Cape Verdean music bands Cabo Verde Show, Mendes e Mendes, and Mendes e Mendes & O'asah

Politicians

Evandro Carvalho, American politician
Vinny deMacedo (1965–)
John Barros (1973–)

Professors and academics
Donaldo Macedo, University of Massachusetts Boston

Sports

Athletics
Márcio Fernandes (1983–), paralympic javelin thrower

Basketball
João Gomes (1985–)

Boxing

Miguel Dias (1968–)
Alviar Lima (1978–)

Football (soccer)

Cafú (1977–)
Dady (1981–)
Gélson Fernandes (1986–), naturalized Swiss, plays for Switzerland
José Emilio Furtado (1983–)
Pedro Pelé (1978–)
Toni Varela (1986–)
José Veiga (1976–)
Nélson Veiga (1978–)

Writers
Eileen Almeida Barbosa
David Barboza (1965–), reporter, The New York Times

Cape Verdean descendants

Actors

Michael Beach (1963–), United States actor
Ashley Holliday (1985–), United States actress
Lena Horne (1917–2010), United States singer, actress, civil rights activist
Sara Martins (1977–), Portuguese-born French actress
Anika Noni Rose (1972–), United States actress, singer
Chelsea Tavares (1991–), United States actress, singer

Artists
Lindsay Grace, United States game designer

Beauty queens
Stephany Amado (2000–), Miss International 2022 1st Runner-Up
Leila Lopes (1986–), Miss Universe 2011
Tatiana Silva (1985–), was Miss Belgium in 2005

Models
Amber Rose (1983–), United States model, recording artist, actress and socialite

Music – singers, musicians and composers

Blu Cantrell (1976–), United States soul singer-songwriter, musician (drums and guitar), Scatter producer
Elvis "E-Life" de Oliveira, Dutch rapper from Rotterdam
Eddy "Eddy Fort Moda Grog" Fortes, Dutch rapper from Rotterdam
Paul Gonsalves (1920–1974), United States musician-woodwinds and tenor saxophone
Lisa "Left Eye" Lopes (1971–2002), United States rapper, singer-songwriter, dancer and was a member of Hip-Hop group TLC
Masspike Miles (1980–), United States singer 
Pebbles (1964–), United States radio presenter, personality and voice-over artist
Paul Pena (1950–2005), United States singer-songwriter and guitarist
Tavares Brothers (1959–), United States R&B, funk and soul music group
Horace Ward Martin "Horace Silver" Tavares Silva (1928–2014 ), hard bop United States Jazz pianist, composer and bandleader
Sara Tavares (1978–), Portuguese singer
Elle Varner (1989–), United States singer-songwriter and multi-instrumentalist

Politicians
Amílcar Cabral (1924–1973), Guinea-Bissau nationalist politician

Professors and academics

Peter J. Gomes (1942–2011), United States preacher and theologian, Harvard University
Charles Manuel "Sweet Daddy" Grace (1881 or 1884–1960), United States bishop
Lindsay Grace, University of Miami

Sports

American football

Stephen Cooper (1979–), United States American football player
Wayne Fontes (1940–), United States American football player
Tony Gonzalez (1976–), United States American football player

Athletics

Henry Andrade (1962–), United States hurdler
Nelson Cruz (1977–), Portuguese long distance runner

Baseball

Wayne Gomes (1973–), United States baseball player
Davey Lopes (1945–), United States baseball player

Boxing

Demetrius "The Best" Andrade (1988–), United States boxer
Marvelous Marvin Hagler (1954–), United States boxer

Basketball (NBA)

Dana Barros (1967–), United States basketball player
Ryan Gomes (1982–), United States basketball player
Charles D. Smith (1965–), United States basketball player

Football (soccer)

 Bruno Paz
 Dion Pereira
Gelson Martins
Jerson Cabral (1991–), Dutch football player
Luc Castaignos (1992–), Dutch football player
David Mendes da Silva (1982–), Dutch football player
Lerin Duarte (1990–), Dutch football player
Manuel Fernandes (1986–), Portuguese football player
Henrik Larsson (1971–), Swedish football player
Cecilio Lopes (1979–), Dutch football player
Nani (1986–), Portuguese football player
Guy Ramos (1985–), Dutch football player
Patrick Vieira (1976–), French football player
Hélder Rosário (1980), Football Player
Roberto Lopes (1992), Irish Football Player

Other sports
Cynthia Barboza (1987–), United States volleyball player
Maria Andrade (1993–), Taekwondo

See also

References